was a Japanese era name (年号, nengō, lit. year name) after Kenryaku and before Jōkyū.  This period spanned the years from December 1213 through April 1219. The reigning emperor was Juntoku-tennō (順徳天皇).

Change of era
 1213 : The new era name was created because the previous era ended and a new one commenced in Kenryaku 3, on the 6th day of the 12th month of 1213.

Events of the Kempo era
 1213 (Kempo 1, 1st day of the 1st month): There was an earthquake at Kamakura.
 1213 (Kempo 1, 11th month): Fujiwara no Teika, also known as Fujiwara no Sadeie offered a collection of 8th century poems to Shōgun Sanetomo. These poems were collectively known as the Man'yōshū.
 1214 (Kempo 2, 2nd month): Shōgun Sanetomo, having drunk too much sake, was feeling somewhat uncomfortable; and the Buddhist priest Eisai, who was the grand priest of the Jufuku-ji temple-complex, presented the shōgun with an excellent tea, which restored his good health.
 1214 (Kempo 2, 3rd month): The emperor went to Kasuga.
 1214 (Kempo 2, 4th month): A group of militant priests living on Mt. Hiei set fire to the central temple structure at Enryaku-ji. The damage was repaired at the expense of Shōgun Sanetomo.
 1215 (Kempo 3, 1st month): Hōjō Tokimasa died at age 78 in the mountains of Izu province.
 1215 (Kempo 3, 6th month):  The well-known priest Eisai died at age 75; his remains were interred at the temple of Kennin-ji which he had founded in Kyoto.
 1215 (Kempo 3, 8th-9th months): There were many, serial earthquakes in the Kamakura area.
 1217 (Kempo 5, 8th-9th months): The emperor visited the Shrines at Hirano and at Ōharano near Kyoto.

Notes

References
 Brown, Delmer and Ichiro Ishida. (1979). The Future and the Past: a translation and study of the 'Gukanshō', an interpretative history of Japan written in 1219.  Berkeley: University of California Press. ;  OCLC 5145872
 Kitagawa, Hiroshi and Bruce T. Tsuchida, eds. (1975). The Tale of the Heike. Tokyo: University of Tokyo Press. 	; ; ; ;  OCLC 193064639
 Nussbaum, Louis-Frédéric and Käthe Roth. (2005).  Japan encyclopedia. Cambridge: Harvard University Press. ;  OCLC 58053128
 Titsingh, Isaac. (1834). Nihon Odai Ichiran; ou,  Annales des empereurs du Japon.  Paris: Royal Asiatic Society, Oriental Translation Fund of Great Britain and Ireland. OCLC 5850691
 Varley, H. Paul. (1980). A Chronicle of Gods and Sovereigns: Jinnō Shōtōki of Kitabatake Chikafusa. New York: Columbia University Press. ;  OCLC 6042764

External links
 National Diet Library, "The Japanese Calendar" -- historical overview plus illustrative images from library's collection

Japanese eras
1210s in Japan